The Waiting Room is a 2010 Indian Hindi-language thriller film directed by Maneej Premnath and produced by Sunil Doshi, starring Raj Singh Chaudhary, Radhika Apte, Sandeep Kulkarni, Prateeksha Lonkar, and Indrajith Sukumaran.

Plot

The story of The Waiting Room takes place in Thenmala, a remote South Indian railway station, where four passengers are left stranded on a rainy night. Reports of a serial killer in the area, lead to a group of distrusting passengers to make assessments of each other with suspicions that one them might be a serial killer, creating fear among them. The dreaded night for the passengers ends with a short investigation leading to the identification of the killer forms the crux of the film.

Cast

Raj Singh Chaudhary as Karan
Radhika Apte as Neeta
Sandeep Kulkarni
Prateeksha Lonkar
Indrajith Sukumaran as Investigation Officer
Sona Nair as Tody shop lady
Gopal Singh
Shelly Kishore
Master Ganapathi as Tea stall boy

References

External links
 

2010 films
2010s Hindi-language films
2010 directorial debut films
Indian thriller films
Films shot in Kerala
Films shot in Kollam
Films set in Kerala